Happiness Becomes You is a memoir published by singer Tina Turner in 2020. Described by the author as "a very personal book that focuses on the core themes of my life: hope, happiness, and faith," it explores details of Turner's life including how she overcame obstacles to achieve happiness and success, and offers Turner's advice on how readers can realize their own dreams. Turner co-authored the book with American writer Taro Gold.

Turner described Happiness Becomes You as a parallel behind-the-scenes story to the HBO documentary film Tina (2021). The book is available in hardcover, ebook, and audiobook formats. It was published in North America by Atria Books, an imprint of Simon & Schuster, by Droemer Knaur in Germany, and in the UK and Commonwealth nations by HarperCollins. As of February 2022, the book has been published in 44 countries and 16 foreign-language editions including Spanish, French, Italian, Finnish, German, Portuguese, Dutch, and Swedish.

Synopsis
Happiness Becomes You contains eight chapters, plus an introduction and afterword, that span the entirety of Turner's life, beginning with stories about her hometown before her birth, then continues through the adversities she faced in her life and career as she worked her way up to eventually become a world-class performer, and concluding with stories about the author's daily life at the time of the book's completion when she was eighty years of age in 2020. The book's eight chapters roughly coincide with the eight decades of Turner's life.

Throughout the book, Turner provides inspirational advice and spiritual tools for the reader's self-empowerment and fulfillment, and she shares how her favorite Buddhist principles helped her overcome poverty, prejudice, illness, loss, and other personal and professional challenges. A glossy photo insert is also contained in the book, with sixteen rare and/or never-before-published images of Turner dating from the late 1970s through 2020.

Reception
Happiness Becomes You was selected as one of the best nonfiction books of the year by Amazon's editors, and chosen as a recommended gift book by the Amazon Book Review during the holiday season after its release on December 1, 2020.

The book became a global best seller upon its publication, including eight weeks on the Top 20 of the Spiegel best seller list for Germany, Austria, Holland, and Switzerland. It also reached the No. 1 best selling spot in the spiritual-themed book category.

The book received positive reviews from Publishers Weekly, USA Today, Variety, People, Library Journal, Vanity Fair, the San Francisco Chronicle, and received a starred review from the American Library Association's Booklist.

Soundtrack
Turner curated a twenty-two-song playlist soundtrack for the launch of the book called Come Up Smiling, that was published by Graydon Carter's Air Mail digital magazine and on Spotify. In the accompanying Air Mail article, she offered her thoughts on the power of music to lift one's spirits. The playlist consists of tracks from eighteen artists, including Mary J. Blige, Beyoncé, Katy Perry, Andra Day, Jill Scott, Olivia Newton-John, Herbie Hancock, Taro Gold, Marvin Gaye, Janelle Monae and two songs by Turner herself.

References 

African-American autobiographies
American memoirs
Books about singers
Books about Buddhism
Literature by African-American women
Music autobiographies
Philosophy books
Show business memoirs
Simon & Schuster books
Tina Turner
2020 non-fiction books
Atria Publishing Group books